Józef Achilles Puchała (18 March 1911, Kosina – 19 July 1943, Borowikowszczyzna) was a Polish Franciscan friar from the Iwieniec (Ivyanets) monastery, tortured and killed by the Nazis during World War II and beatified by Pope John Paul II on 13 June 1999.

He was born on 18 March 1911 to Franciszka and Zofii née Olbrycht and was baptized the same day. He entered seminary in Lviv in 1924, took his vows on 22 May 1932, and was ordained on 5 July 1932.

At the age of 16 he was admitted to the order of Franciscans. Between 1932 and 1937 he studied philosophy and theology in Kraków. He was ordained in 1936. After completing his studies he joined the Franciscan friary in Grodno. In 1939 he became a second vicar in Iwieniec (Ivyanets).

At the start of World War II he was moved to a nearby village as a provost of parish of St. Mary Magdalene. After the anti-Nazi uprising in Iwieniec, in June 1943 the local population was arrested by the Germans. Although Puchała had the opportunity, he chose not to escape and instead remained with his parishioners.

"Operation Hermann" was an operation by the Nazi's targeted especially against the Polish resistance movement. One of the many victims of Nazi terror was the Franciscan brothers Joseph Achilles Puchała and Charles Herman Stępień, who were tortured to death. They were beatified by Pope John Paul II in 1999 among the 108 Martyrs of World War II,

References

1911 births
1943 deaths
108 Blessed Polish Martyrs
Polish civilians killed in World War II